In mathematics, a transformation of a sequence's generating function provides a method of converting the generating function for one sequence into a generating function enumerating another. These transformations typically involve integral formulas applied to a sequence generating function (see integral transformations) or weighted sums over the higher-order derivatives of these functions (see derivative transformations).

Given a sequence, the ordinary generating function (OGF) of the sequence, denoted , and the exponential generating function (EGF) of the sequence, denoted , are defined by the formal power series

In this article, we use the convention that the ordinary (exponential) generating function for a sequence  is denoted by the uppercase function  /  for some fixed or formal  when the context of this notation is clear.
The main article gives examples of generating functions for many sequences. Other examples of generating function variants include Dirichlet generating functions (DGFs), Lambert series, and Newton series. In this article we focus on transformations of generating functions in mathematics and keep a running list of useful transformations and transformation formulas.

Extracting arithmetic progressions of a sequence

In the first two cases where , we can expand these arithmetic progression generating functions directly in terms of :

 

More generally, suppose that  and that  denotes the  primitive root of unity. Then we have the following formula, often known as the root of unity filter:

For integers , another useful formula providing somewhat reversed floored arithmetic progressions are generated by the identity

Powers of an OGF and composition with functions

The exponential Bell polynomials, are defined by the exponential generating function

The next formulas for powers, logarithms, and compositions of formal power series are expanded by these polynomials with variables in the coefficients of the original generating functions.

Reciprocals of an OGF (special case of the powers formula)

The power series for the reciprocal of a generating function, is expanded by

If we let  denote the coefficients in the expansion of the reciprocal generating function, then we have the following recurrence relation:

Powers of an OGF

Let  be fixed, suppose that , and denote . Then we have a series expansion for  given by

and the coefficients  satisfy a recurrence relation of the form

Another formula for the coefficients, is expanded by the Bell polynomials as

where  denotes the Pochhammer symbol.

Logarithms of an OGF

If we let  and define , then we have a power series expansion for the composite generating function given by

where the coefficients, in the previous expansion satisfy the recurrence relation given by

and a corresponding formula expanded by the Bell polynomials in the form of the power series coefficients of the following generating function:

Faà di Bruno's formula

Let  denote the EGF of the sequence, and suppose that  is the EGF of the sequence, . Faà di Bruno's formula implies that the sequence, generated by the composition , can be expressed in terms of the exponential Bell polynomials as follows:

Integral transformations

OGF ⟷ EGF conversion formulas

Notice that the first and last of these integral formulas are used to convert between the EGF to the OGF of a sequence, and from the OGF to the EGF of a sequence whenever these integrals are convergent.

Other integral representations for the gamma function in the second of the previous formulas can of course also be used to construct similar integral transformations. One particular formula results in the case of the double factorial function example given immediately below in this section.

Example: A double factorial integral for the EGF of the Stirling numbers of the second kind

The single factorial function, is expressed as a product of two double factorial functions of the form

where an integral for the double factorial function, or rational gamma function, is given by

for natural numbers . This integral representation of  then implies that for fixed non-zero  and any integral powers , we have the formula

Thus for any prescribed integer , we can use the previous integral representation together with the formula for extracting arithmetic progressions from a sequence OGF given above, to formulate the next integral representation for the so-termed modified Stirling number EGF as

which is convergent provided suitable conditions on the parameter .

Example: An EGF formula for the higher-order derivatives of the geometric series

for non-negative integers . These  derivatives of the ordinary geometric series can be shown, for example by induction, to satisfy an explicit closed-form formula given by

for any  whenever . As an example of the third OGF  EGF conversion formula cited above, we can compute the following corresponding exponential forms of the generating functions :

Fractional integrals and derivatives

Fractional integrals and fractional derivatives (see the main article) form another generalized class of integration and differentiation operations that can be applied to the OGF of a sequence to form the corresponding OGF of a transformed sequence. For  we define the fractional integral operator (of order ) by the integral transformation

which corresponds to the (formal) power series given by

For fixed  defined such that , we have that the operators . 
Moreover, for fixed  and integers  satisfying  we can define the notion of the fractional derivative satisfying the properties that

and

 for 

Polylogarithm series transformations

For fixed , we have that (compare to the special case of the integral formula for the Nielsen generalized polylogarithm function defined in) 

Notice that if we set , the integral with respect to the generating function, in the last equation when  corresponds to the Dirichlet generating function, or DGF, of the sequence of  provided that the integral converges. This class of polylogarithm-related integral transformations is related to the derivative-based zeta series transformations defined in the next sections.

Square series generating function transformations

This result, which is proved in the reference, follows from a variant of the double factorial function transformation integral for the Stirling numbers of the second kind given as an example above. In particular, since

we can use a variant of the positive-order derivative-based OGF transformations defined in the next sections involving the Stirling numbers of the second kind to obtain an integral formula for the generating function of the sequence, and then perform a sum over the  derivatives of the formal OGF,  to obtain the result in the previous equation where the arithmetic progression generating function at hand is denoted by

for each fixed .

Hadamard products and diagonal generating functions

where I is the imaginary unit.

More information about Hadamard products as diagonal generating functions of multivariate sequences and/or generating functions and the classes of generating functions these diagonal OGFs belong to is found in Stanley's book. The reference also provides nested coefficient extraction formulas of the form

Example: Hadamard products of rational generating functions

In general, the Hadamard product of two rational generating functions is itself rational. This is seen by noticing that the coefficients of a rational generating function form quasi-polynomial terms of the form

For example, the Hadamard product of the two generating functions

and

is given by the rational generating function formula

Example: Factorial (approximate Laplace) transformations

Ordinary generating functions for generalized factorial functions formed as special cases of the generalized rising factorial product functions, or Pochhammer k-symbol, defined by

where  is fixed, and  denotes the Pochhammer symbol are generated (at least formally) by the Jacobi-type J-fractions (or special forms of continued fractions) established in the reference. If we let  denote the  convergent to these infinite continued fractions where the component convergent functions are defined for all integers  by

and

where  denotes an associated Laguerre polynomial, then we have that the  convergent function, exactly enumerates the product sequences, for all . For each , the  convergent function is expanded as a finite sum involving only paired reciprocals of the Laguerre polynomials in the form of

This observation suggests an approach to approximating the exact (formal) Laplace–Borel transform usually given in terms of the integral representation from the previous section by a Hadamard product, or diagonal-coefficient, generating function. In particular, given any OGF  we can form the approximate Laplace transform, which is -order accurate, by the diagonal coefficient extraction formula stated above given by

Examples of sequences enumerated through these diagonal coefficient generating functions arising from the sequence factorial function multiplier provided by the rational convergent functions include

Other examples of sequences enumerated through applications of these rational Hadamard product generating functions given in the article include the Barnes G-function, combinatorial sums involving the double factorial function, sums of powers sequences, and sequences of binomials.

Derivative transformations

Positive and negative-order zeta series transformations

where  denotes a Stirling number of the second kind. 
In particular, we have the following special case identity when  when  denotes the triangle of first-order Eulerian numbers:

In particular, for integers , define these generalized classes of Stirling numbers of the second kind by the formula

A table of the first few zeta series transformation coefficients, appears below. These weighted-harmonic-number expansions are almost identical to the known formulas for the Stirling numbers of the first kind up to the leading sign on the weighted harmonic number terms in the expansions.

Examples of the negative-order zeta series transformations

The next series related to the polylogarithm functions (the dilogarithm and trilogarithm functions, respectively), the alternating zeta function and the Riemann zeta function are formulated from the previous negative-order series results found in the references. In particular, when  (or equivalently, when  in the table above), we have the following special case series for the dilogarithm and corresponding constant value of the alternating zeta function:

When  (or when  in the notation used in the previous subsection), we similarly obtain special case series for these functions given by

It is known that the first-order harmonic numbers have a closed-form exponential generating function expanded in terms of the natural logarithm, the incomplete gamma function, and the exponential integral given by

Additional series representations for the r-order harmonic number exponential generating functions for integers  are formed as special cases of these negative-order derivative-based series transformation results. For example, the second-order harmonic numbers have a corresponding exponential generating function expanded by the series

Generalized negative-order zeta series transformations

A further generalization of the negative-order series transformations defined above is related to more Hurwitz-zeta-like, or Lerch-transcendent-like, generating functions. Specifically, if we define the even more general parametrized Stirling numbers of the second kind by

,

for non-zero  such that , and some fixed , we have that

Moreover, for any integers , we have the partial series approximations to the full infinite series in the previous equation given by

Examples of the generalized negative-order zeta series transformations

Series for special constants and zeta-related functions resulting from these generalized derivative-based series transformations typically involve the generalized r-order harmonic numbers defined by 
 for integers . A pair of particular series expansions for the following constants when  is fixed follow from special cases of BBP-type identities as

Several other series for the zeta-function-related cases of the Legendre chi function, the polygamma function, and the Riemann zeta function include

Additionally, we can give another new explicit series representation of the inverse tangent function through its relation to the Fibonacci numbers expanded as in the references by

Inversion relations and generating function identities

Inversion relations

An inversion relation is a pair of equations of the form

which is equivalent to the orthogonality relation

This goal in some respects mirrors the more number theoretic (Lambert series) generating function relation guaranteed by the Möbius inversion formula, which provides that whenever

is given in the form of

where the corresponding inversion formulas between the two sequences is given in the reference.

The remainder of the results and examples given in this section sketch some of the more well-known generating function transformations provided by sequences related by inversion formulas (the binomial transform and the Stirling transform), and provides several tables of known inversion relations of various types cited in Riordan's Combinatorial Identities book. In many cases, we omit the corresponding functional equations implied by the inversion relationships between two sequences (this part of the article needs more work).

The binomial transform

The first inversion relation provided below implicit to the binomial transform is perhaps the simplest of all inversion relations we will consider in this section.

we have functional equations between the OGFs and EGFs of these sequences provided by the binomial transform in the forms of

and

The Stirling transform

these inversion relations between the two sequences translate into functional equations between the sequence EGFs given by the Stirling transform as

and

Tables of inversion pairs from Riordan's book

These tables appear in chapters 2 and 3 in Riordan's book providing an introduction to inverse relations with many examples, though which does not stress functional equations between the generating functions of sequences related by these inversion relations. The interested reader is encouraged to pick up a copy of the original book for more details.

Several forms of the simplest inverse relations

Gould classes of inverse relations

forming several special cases of Gould classes of inverse relations are given in the next table.

These terms are also somewhat simplified from their original forms in the table by the identities

The simpler Chebyshev inverse relations

The so-termed simpler cases of the Chebyshev classes of inverse relations in the subsection below are given in the next table.

The formulas in the table are simplified somewhat by the following identities:

Additionally the inversion relations given in the table also hold when  in any given relation.

Chebyshev classes of inverse relations

for non-zero integers 
forming several special cases of Chebyshev classes of inverse relations are given in the next table.

The formulas given in the previous table are simplified somewhat by the identities

The simpler Legendre inverse relations

Legendre–Chebyshev classes of inverse relations

The Legendre–Chebyshev classes of inverse relations correspond to inversion relations of the form

In general, given a class of Chebyshev inverse pairs of the form

Similarly, if the positive integer  is composite, we can derive inversion pairs of the form

The next table summarizes several generalized classes of Legendre–Chebyshev inverse relations for some non-zero integer .

Abel inverse relations

Abel inverse relations correspond to Abel inverse pairs of the form

The next table summarizes several notable forms of these Abel inverse relations.

Inverse relations derived from ordinary generating functions

If we let the convolved Fibonacci numbers, be defined by

we have the next table of inverse relations which are obtained from properties of ordinary sequence generating functions proved as in section 3.3 of Riordan's book.

Inverse relations derived from exponential generating functions

The next table summarizes several notable cases of inversion relations obtained from exponential generating functions in section 3.4 of Riordan's book.

Multinomial inverses

The inverse relations used in formulating the binomial transform cited in the previous subsection are generalized to corresponding two-index inverse relations for sequences of two indices, and to multinomial inversion formulas for sequences of  indices involving the binomial coefficients in Riordan. 
In particular, we have the form of a two-index inverse relation given by

and the more general form of a multinomial pair of inversion formulas given by

Notes

References

External links

 Why don't they teach Newton's calculus of 'What comes next?' - Mathologer

Generating functions